Protein digestibility refers to how well a given protein is digested. Along with the amino acid score, protein digestibility determines the values for PDCAAS and DIAAS.

See also 

 Biological value

References

Proteins
Nutrition